Umesh Virkumar Vazirani is an Indian-American academic who is the Roger A. Strauch Professor of Electrical Engineering and Computer Science at the University of California, Berkeley, and the director of the Berkeley Quantum Computation Center. His research interests lie primarily in quantum computing. He is also a co-author of a textbook on algorithms.

Biography
Vazirani received a BS from MIT in 1981 and received his Ph.D. in 1986 from UC Berkeley under the supervision of Manuel Blum.

He is the brother of University of California, Irvine professor Vijay Vazirani.

Research
Vazirani is one of the founders of the field of quantum computing. His 1993 paper with his student Ethan Bernstein on quantum complexity theory defined a model of quantum Turing machines which was amenable to complexity based analysis. This paper also gave an algorithm for the quantum Fourier transform, which was then used by Peter Shor within a year in his celebrated quantum algorithm for factoring integers.

This result shows that the Grover search algorithm is optimal. It also shows that quantum computers cannot solve NP-complete problems in polynomial time using only the certifier.

Awards and honors
In 2005 both Vazirani and his brother Vijay Vazirani were inducted as Fellows of the Association for Computing Machinery, Umesh for "contributions to theoretical computer science and quantum computation" and his brother Vijay for his work on approximation algorithms. Vazirani was awarded the Fulkerson Prize for 2012 for his work on improving the approximation ratio for graph separators and related problems (jointly with Satish Rao and Sanjeev Arora). In 2018, he was elected to the National Academy of Sciences.

Selected publications
. A preliminary version of this paper was also published in STOC '87.
.
.
.

References

External links
Web page at UC Berkeley

Year of birth missing (living people)
Living people
Indian emigrants to the United States
Fellows of the Association for Computing Machinery
Theoretical computer scientists
20th-century Indian mathematicians
21st-century Indian mathematicians
20th-century American mathematicians
21st-century American mathematicians
University of California, Berkeley alumni
UC Berkeley College of Engineering faculty
American people of Sindhi descent
Sindhi people
American academics of Indian descent
Quantum information scientists
American textbook writers